Ulla Marie Skoog (born 23 February 1951) is a Swedish actress and comedian. She also works as director in TV and at Stockholm City Theatre.

Skoog studied at the Swedish National Academy of Mime and Acting from 1979 until 1981, when she started working at Stockholm City Theatre.

Since the end of the 90s Skoog has performed together with Tomas von Brömssen, among the performances they have performed their revues Rent under and Fritt fall. She has also been appreciated for her own performances Ulla Skoog m mus and Ulla Skoog & Trond Lindheim trallar vidare. She has worked with Trond Lindheim, the composer, arranger and pianist, since 2003.

Skoog received Karamelodiktstipendiet in 1990.

Selected filmography
2018 - Storm på Lugna gatan
2016 - The voice as Dory in Finding Dory
2015 - The voice as Sadness in Inside Out
2012 - The Last Sentence
2005, 2007 & 2010 - Saltön (TV)
2003 - The voice as Dory in Finding Nemo
1999 - Reuter & Skoog (TV)
1996 - Bill Bergson Lives Dangerously
1995 - Pensionat Oskar
1995 - En på miljonen
1994 - Pillertrillaren
1994 - Yrrol
1990 - Kurt Olssons julkalender (TV)
1990 - Kurt Olsson – filmen om mitt liv som mig själv
1989 - Ture Sventon (TV)
1989 - Tre kärlekar (TV)
1989 - Lorry
1988 - S.O.S. – En segelsällskapsresa
1986 - Kunglig toilette

References

External links
 
Ulla Skoog on Riksteatern's website
Official website

Living people
Swedish comedians
1951 births
Swedish actresses
People from Partille Municipality
Best Supporting Actress Guldbagge Award winners